Derwin Alonzo James Jr. (born August 3, 1996) is an American football strong safety for the Los Angeles Chargers of the National Football League (NFL). He played college football at Florida State. He was drafted by the Chargers in the first round of the 2018 NFL Draft.

Early years
James attended Auburndale High School in Auburndale, Florida before transferring to his hometown Haines City High School in Haines City, Florida. He was rated by Rivals.com as a five-star recruit and was ranked as the best safety and fifth best player overall in his class. James committed to Florida State University to play college football as a freshman, being offered a scholarship after his freshman year in high school.

College career
James entered his true freshman season at Florida State in 2015 as a backup, but eventually became a starter. As a freshman in 2015, James played in 12 games with 91 tackles, 4.5 sacks, four passes defended, two forced fumbles, and two fumble recoveries.

Before his sophomore season, James was ranked as the third-best second year player, behind only Josh Rosen and Calvin Ridley, by Lance Zierlein. On September 13, 2016, it was revealed that James would undergo knee surgery to repair a lateral meniscus tear and cartilage damage. Recovery time required 5 to 7 weeks. His sophomore year was short-lived, as James only played two games with 11 tackles and an interception. He was granted a redshirt for his following year, and as a redshirted sophomore in 2017, he played in 12 games, finishing with 84 tackles, 2 interceptions, 11 passes defended, and a sack. On December 7, 2017, James decided to forgo his remaining two years of eligibility and enter the 2018 NFL Draft.

Professional career
On December 5, 2017, James released a statement through his Instagram account that announced his decision to forgo his remaining eligibility and enter the 2018 NFL Draft. As a result of his decision, he also chose to skip the 2017 Independence Bowl. James attended the NFL Scouting Combine in Indianapolis and completed the majority of combine drills, but opted to skip the short shuttle and three-cone drill. His combine performance impressed scouts and draft experts as he finished third among all defensive backs in the bench press and ninth among all safeties in the 40-yard dash. He also finished fifth among all defensive backs in the broad jump and sixth in the vertical.

On March 20, 2018, James participated at Florida State's pro day, but opted to stand on his combine numbers and only ran the short shuttle, three-cone drill, and positional drills. James also attended pre-draft visits with the Green Bay Packers and Tampa Bay Buccaneers, but reportedly declined to attend a private workout with the Buccaneers who held the 12th overall pick. At the conclusion of the pre-draft process, James was projected to be a first round pick by NFL draft experts and scouts. He was expected to be one of the first 15 players drafted. He was ranked the top free safety prospect in the draft by DraftScout.com and was ranked the second best safety by NFL analyst Mike Mayock and Sports Illustrated.

The Los Angeles Chargers selected James in the first round (17th overall) in the 2018 NFL Draft. James was the second safety drafted in 2018, behind Alabama safety Minkah Fitzpatrick (11th overall, Miami Dolphins). 

On June 1, 2018, the Los Angeles Chargers signed James to a fully guaranteed four-year, $12.38 million contract that includes a signing bonus of $7.09 million.

2018

James entered training camp slated as the starting strong safety, but suffered a hamstring injury that limited his progress. He also saw competition for the role from veterans Adrian Phillips and Rayshawn Jenkins. Head coach Anthony Lynn named James the starting strong safety to begin the regular season, alongside free safety Jahleel Addae.

He made his professional regular season debut and first career start in the Los Angeles Chargers' season-opener against the Kansas City Chiefs and recorded three combined tackles, broke up two passes, and made his first career sack on quarterback Patrick Mahomes in their 38–28 loss. On September 23, 2018, James collected nine combined tackles, deflected a pass, and made his first professional interception during a 35–23 loss at the Los Angeles Rams in Week 3. James made his first career interception off a pass attempt by Rams' quarterback Jared Goff, that was originally intended for tight end Gerald Everett, in the end zone during the second quarter. On December 18, 2018 he was named to his first Pro Bowl in his rookie year. On July 28, 2019 James was ranked No. 31 on the NFL Top 100 players of 2019 list.

2019 
On August 15, it was revealed that James had been dealing with a stress fracture in his right foot. The injury required surgery, requiring a maximum of three months to recover. He was placed on injured reserve on September 1, 2019. He was designated for return from injured reserve on November 25, 2019, and began practicing with the team again. He was activated on November 30, 2019.

2020 
On September 5, 2020, James was placed on season-ending injured reserve after undergoing surgery to repair a torn meniscus. He was placed on the reserve/COVID-19 list by the team on December 15, 2020, and moved back to injured reserve on January 7, 2021.

2021

The Chargers exercised the fifth-year option on James' contract on April 30, 2021, which guarantees a salary of $9.05 million for the 2022 season. On 22 December 2021, James was named to his second Pro Bowl.

2022 
On August 17, 2022, James signed a four-year, $76.4 million contract extension with the Chargers, including $42 million in guaranteed money. On 21 December 2022, James was named to his third Pro Bowl. On December 26, 2022, in a game against the Indianapolis Colts, James was ejected after a helmet-to-helmet hit on wide receiver Ashton Dulin.

NFL career statistics

Regular season

Postseason

Personal life
James is a cousin of Vince Williams and Karlos Williams, both former Florida State Seminoles players, as well as Mike James, former Miami Hurricanes running back. He is also the second cousin of former Miami Hurricanes and NFL star running back Edgerrin James.  He is a member of Phi Beta Sigma fraternity

References

External links

Florida State Seminoles bio
Los Angeles Chargers bio

1996 births
Living people
American football safeties
Florida State Seminoles football players
Los Angeles Chargers players
People from Haines City, Florida
Players of American football from Florida
Sportspeople from Polk County, Florida
American Conference Pro Bowl players
Ed Block Courage Award recipients